Soulasen Phommasen (born 1992) is a Laotian freestyle swimmer. He competed in the 50 m freestyle event at the 2010 FINA World Swimming Championships (25 m) and in the 50 m and 100 m freestyle events at the 2013 World Aquatics Championships.

References

Living people
1992 births
Laotian male freestyle swimmers